Lecithocera pelomorpha is a moth in the family Lecithoceridae. It is found in Taiwan and the provinces of Sichuan, Yunnan, Hunan and Zhejiang in China.

The wingspan is 18–21 mm. The forewings are yellowish brown.

References

Moths described in 1931
Taxa named by Edward Meyrick
pelomorpha